Pedro José Ramón Gual Escandón (17 January 1783, in Caracas, Venezuela – 6 May 1862, in Guayaquil, Ecuador), was a Venezuelan lawyer, politician, journalist and diplomat.

During the Venezuelan War of Independence he came to the United States to buy weapons for the Patriots. In 1815 he came to stay in the home of Manuel Torres. With Torres and other agents he helped organize General Francisco Xavier Mina's ill-fated expedition to Mexico, with Gual acting as Mina's press agent. Gual was one of the men who signed Gregor MacGregor's commission to invade Amelia Island in 1817, which offended President James Monroe's administration; thereafter he left the U.S.

In 1824 as chancellor of Great Colombia he negotiated with the U.S. diplomat Richard Clough Anderson Jr. and concluded the Anderson–Gual Treaty, the first bilateral treaty that the U.S. signed with another American state.  He was the president of Venezuela for three periods (1858, 1859, and 1861) and a member of the Conservative Centralist party.

See also 
Anderson–Gual Treaty
Federal War
Presidents of Venezuela

References 

  "Diccionario de Historia de Venezuela", Fundación Polar, 1997.
  "Los Presidentes Volumen I/1811-1863" Ramón Urdaneta, Fondo Editorial Venezolano, 1995.
  Pedro Gual
  Gran Logia Unida de Venezuela
  Biography of the Foreign Affairs Ministry

External links

  Pedro Gual Biography

1783 births
1862 deaths
Politicians from Caracas
Central University of Venezuela alumni
19th-century Venezuelan lawyers
Venezuelan journalists
Presidents of Venezuela
Vice presidents of Venezuela
Finance ministers of Venezuela
Foreign ministers of Colombia
Conservative Party (Venezuela) politicians